Jennifer Darling (born Joan Darling; June 19, 1946, in Pittsburgh, Pennsylvania) is an American voice, film and television actress. Her best-known role on screen was as Peggy Callahan in  The Six Million Dollar Man and its spin-off The Bionic Woman. In anime, she is the voice of Ayeka in the English dub of Tenchi Muyo for most of the English adaptions.

Early life 
Born on June 19, 1946, and a native of Pittsburgh, Pennsylvania, Darling began taking dancing classes when she was 3 years old. She sang and danced on The Original Amateur Hour when she was 14. While she attended Carnegie Tech, she met Paul Itkin, and they married before they graduated. They have a daughter. She was born Joan Darling, but she had to change her name for professional purposes because another actress named Joan Darling had already registered that name with Actors' Equity Association.

Filmography

Anime
 Astro Boy – Nora
 Blood+ – Ms. Lee
 Hello Kitty – Mama
 Tenchi Muyo! series – Ayeka Masaki Jurai, Tokimi (OVA 2)

Animation (non-anime)
 Aladdin – Hippsodeth
 MoonDreamers – DreamGazer
 Annabelle's Wish – Star
 Bump in the Night – The Cute Dolls
 Bionic Six – Madame O
 Capitol Critters – Berkeley
 Care Bears: Welcome to Care-a-Lot – Grams Bear
 Dink, The Little Dinosaur – Ariel the Parasaurolophus
 The Centurions – Amber
 Christmas in Tattertown – Muffet
 Darkwing Duck – Dr. Rhoda Dendron
 The Dukes - Additional Voices (Season 1)
 Foofur - Additional Voices
 Galaxy High – Booey Bubblehead, Mertyl Blastermeier, Wendy Garbo
 G.I. Joe: The Movie – Pythona
 Hound Town – Muffin
 James Bond Jr. - Additional Voices
 Mighty Orbots – Dia
 Visionaries: Knights of the Magical Light – Virulina, Fletchen
 Space Cats - Additional voices
 The Gary Coleman Show – Angelica
 The Grim Adventures of Billy & Mandy – Miss Holly Pollywinkle
 Iron Man – Scarlet Witch
 Poochie – Koom
 The Smurfs – Princess Sabina
 TaleSpin – Mrs. Snarly
 Teenage Mutant Ninja Turtles – Irma (1987 Blu-ray, 1988–1994 VHS/DVD/Blu-ray, 1995-1996 Blu-ray)
 Trollkins – Pixlee Trollsom, Deputroll Dolly
 The Biskitts – Wiggle
 The Mask: Animated Series - Additional Voices
 The Tick – Mynda
 Where's Waldo? – Additional Voices

Live-action
 The Secret Storm – Irene
 Eight Is Enough – Donna
 The Bionic Woman – Peggy Callahan
 The Incredible Hulk (Episode: "Never Give a Trucker an Even Break") – Joanie
 The Six Million Dollar Man – Peggy Callahan
 The New Adventures of Wonder Woman (Episode: "Death in Disguise") – Violet Louise Tree, 1978
 You Are There – Peggy Arnold
 Mad About You – Mrs. Bluestone, aka Marvin's Mom. 1999

Film
 Aladdin – Arabian Woman
 An American Tail: Fievel Goes West - Female Mice #2
 Beauty and the Beast – French Woman #3
 Brother Bear - Female Bear
 A Bug's Life - Female Ants, Fly Mom
 Garfield Gets Real – Bonita, Bobby, Rusty, Mother
 Happily N'Ever After - Additional voices
 Lilo & Stitch - Female Officer
 Hercules - Woman pointing at Young Hercules
 Little Nemo: Adventures in Slumberland – Nemo's Mother
 Madagascar - Crowd Member
 Monsters, Inc. – Female Monster
 Atlantis: The Lost Empire - Queen Kashem Nedakh
 Ponyo - Additional voices (English dub)
 Porco Rosso – Additional voices (English dub)
 Roadside Romeo — Additional voices 
 Kaena: The Prophecy – Reya (English dub)
 Spirited Away – Additional voices (English dub)
 Spirit: Stallion of the Cimarron – Female Horse 3
 Tarzan – Female Gorilla #2
 The Emperor's New Groove – Female Villager #1
 The Hunchback of Notre Dame – Woman #3
 The Iron Giant - Woman
 The Little Mermaid - Female Mermaid
 Toy Story - Additional voices
 Toy Story 2 - Additional voices
 Treasure Planet - Female Alien

Video games
 Baldur's Gate – Shar-Teel Dosan, Kaishas
 Final Fantasy Type-0 HD - Commissar
 King's Quest VIII: The Mask of Eternity – Lady of the Lake, Swamp Wisp, Unicorn/Ugly Beast
 Leisure Suit Larry: Love for Sail! – Victorian/Vikki Principles

References

External links
 Jennifer Darling  at VoiceChasers
 
 
 Jennifer Darling at the English Voice Actor and Production Staff Database

Living people
Actresses from Pittsburgh
American child actresses
American film actresses
American television actresses
American video game actresses
American voice actresses
21st-century American women
1946 births